Jelena Lolović (Serbian Cyrillic: Јелена Лоловић; born in Sarajevo, SR Bosnia and Herzegovina, SFR Yugoslavia on 14 July 1981) is a Serbian alpine skier.

She participated at the 2002, 2006 and 2010 Winter Olympics and was the flag bearer for her country each time.

Olympic results

World Cup standings

See also
 List of flag bearers for Serbia and Montenegro at the Olympics
 List of flag bearers for Serbia at the Olympics
 2010 Winter Olympics national flag bearers

References

External links
 
 
 

1981 births
Serbian female alpine skiers
Serbs of Bosnia and Herzegovina
Alpine skiers at the 2002 Winter Olympics
Alpine skiers at the 2006 Winter Olympics
Alpine skiers at the 2010 Winter Olympics
Olympic alpine skiers of Yugoslavia
Olympic alpine skiers of Serbia and Montenegro
Olympic alpine skiers of Serbia
Universiade medalists in alpine skiing
Sportspeople from Sarajevo
Living people
Universiade gold medalists for Serbia and Montenegro
Universiade silver medalists for Serbia and Montenegro
Universiade bronze medalists for Serbia and Montenegro
Medalists at the 2003 Winter Universiade
Competitors at the 2005 Winter Universiade